Crock: Original Motion Picture Soundtrack is the second studio album by Bügsküll, released in 1995 by Pop Secret.

Track listing

Personnel 
Adapted from the Crock liner notes.
Bügsküll
Brendan Bell
Sean Byrne
James Yu

Release history

References

External links 
 

1995 albums
Bugskull albums